Nationality words link to articles with information on the nation's poetry or literature (for instance, Irish or France).

Events
 In February, Myōjō ("Bright Star" or "Morning Star"), a monthly literary magazine, begins publication in Japan.  between February 1900 and November 1908. It was the organ of the Shinshisha ("New Poetry Society") founded in 1899 by Yosano Tekkan (who became editor-in-chief and who later revived the magazine after it first went defunct in 1908). The magazine was initially known for its development and promotion of a modernized version of the 31-syllable tanka poetry. Famous contributors included Yosano Akiko, Hagiwara Sakutaro, Ishikawa Takuboku, Iwano Homei, Kitahara Hakushu, Noguchi Yonejiro, Kinoshita Rigen, and Sato Haruo. The magazine was advised by Mori Ōgai, Ueda Bin and Baba Kocho. Myōjō gradually transformed itself from purely tanka poetry to a sophisticated journal promoting the visual arts as well as Western-style poetry, and became an influential publication in Japanese poetry.

Works published in English

Australia
 Henry Lawson, Verses, Popular and Humorous, Angus & Robertson
 Bernard O'Dowd, "Australia"
 Banjo Paterson, An Outback Marriage

Canada
 William Wilfred Campbell, Beyond the Hills of Dream. Toronto.
 Archibald Lampman, The Poems of Archibald Lampman, Duncan Campbell Scott ed., (Toronto: Morang).
 Alexander McLachlan, Poetical Works of Alexander McLachlan.
 Frederick George Scott, Poems Old and New.
 Francis Sherman, A Canadian Calendar: XII Lyrics. Havana, Cuba.United Kingdom
 G. K. Chesterton:
 Graybeards at Play The Wild Knight and Other Poems Ford Madox Ford, Poems for Pictures and for Notes of Music W. E. Henley, For England's Sake Charles Murray, Hamewith, Scots
 Arthur Quiller-Couch, editor, Oxford Book of English Verse 1250-1900 Lady Margaret Sackville, Floral SymphonyUnited States
 Gelett Burgess, Goops and How to Be Them Stephen Crane, The Black Riders and Other Lines George Moses Horton's Poetical Works George Santayana, Interpretations of Poetry and Religion Ridgely Torrence, The House of a Hundred LightsOther in English
 W.B. Yeats, The Shadowy Waters, Ireland

Works published in other languages
 Konstantin Balmont, Burning Buildings (Gorya′schye zda′niya), his 5th collection of poetry and the one that makes him famous in Russia.
 Natalie Clifford Barney, Quelques Portraits-Sonnets de Femmes, American writing in French and published in Paris
 Paul Claudel, Connaissance de l'Est ("Knowledge of the East"), (expanded edition published in 1907) France
 Stefan George, Hymnen, Pilgerfahrten, and Algabal, a one-volume edition published in Berlin by Georg Bondi which first makes George's work available to the public at large; German
 Marie-Madeleine, Auf Kypros, Germany
 Gregorio Martínez Sierra, Flores de escarcha ("Frost Flowers"), Spain
 C. R. Reddy, Musalamma Maranam, Indian, Telugu-language poem written in traditional metrical form but with a modern outlook, a landmark work in Telugu poetry
 Paul Valéry, Album de vers anciens, published starting in 1890 and ending this year; France

Births
Death years link to the corresponding "[year] in poetry" article:
 January 31 – Marie Luise Kaschnitz (died 1974), German short story writer, novelist, essayist and poet
 February 19 – Giorgos Seferis (died 1971), Greek poet, diplomat and winner of the Nobel Prize in Literature in 1963
 March 3 – Basil Bunting (died 1985), British modernist poet
 March 4 – Jean-Joseph Rabearivelo or "Rebearivelo" (died 1937), Malagassy, French-language poet
 April 1 – Alexandru A. Philippide (died 1979), Romanian poet
 April 19 – Richard Hughes (died 1976), British poet, novelist, playwright and writer
 May 11 – Rose Ausländer maiden name and pen name of Rosalie Beatrice Scherzer (died 1988), German poet and writer
 May 30 – Itsik Manger (or "Itzig Manger") (died 1969)
 June 10:
 Eric Maschwitz (died 1969) English poet, entertainer, writer, broadcaster and broadcasting executive
 Wilhelm Emanuel Süskind (died 1970)  German writer, poet, journalist and translator
 July 4 – Robert Desnos (died 1945), French surrealist poet
 July 22 — Edward Dahlberg (died 1977), American novelist, writer and poet
 August 12 – Robert Francis (died 1987), American
 August 20 – Salvatore Quasimodo (died 1968), Italian poet who won the Nobel Prize for Literature in 1959
 August 23 – Tatsuji Miyoshi 三好達治 (died 1964), Japanese Shōwa period literary critic, editor and poet
 September 23 – Jaroslav Seifert (died 1986), Czech writer, poet and journalist who won the Nobel Prize for Literature in 1984
 October 17 – Yvor Winters (died 1968) American literary critic and poet
 October 20 – Jack Lindsay (died 1990), Australian
 December 21 – Oda Schaefer (died 1988), German
 Also:
 Emil Barth (poet) (died 1958), German
 Adolf Beiss (died 1981), German
 Otto Heuschele (died 1996), German
 Ernest G. Moll (died 1997), Australian
 Hermann Kesten (poet) (died 1996), German
 Paula Ludwig (died 1974), German
 Eckart Peterich (died 1968), German
 Friedrich Rasche (died 1965), German

Deaths
Birth years link to the corresponding "[year] in poetry" article:
 January 19 – William Larminie, 50 (born 1849), Irish poet and folklorist
 January 20 – R. D. Blackmore (born 1825), English novelist and poet
 January 23 – Richard Watson Dixon, 76 (born 1833), English poet and divine
 January 29 – John Ruskin, 80 (born 1819), English art critic and social critic
 January 31 – John Sholto Douglas, 9th Marquess of Queensberry, 55 (born 1844), nemesis of Oscar Wilde
 February 21 – Henry Duff Traill, 67 (born 1842), British author, poet and journalist
 February 23 – Ernest Dowson, 32 (born 1867), English poet associated with the Decadent movement
 February 24 – Richard Hovey, 35 (born 1864), American composer, poet and artist
 June 5 – Stephen Crane, 28 (born 1871), American novelist, poet and journalist
 August 24 – Friedrich Nietzsche (born 1844), German philosopher, classical philologist and poet
 October 20 – Naim Frashëri, 54 (born 1846), Albanian poet and writer
 November 30 – Oscar Wilde, 46 (born 1854), Irish playwright, novelist, poet and short story writer
 Also:
 Ludwig Jacobowski (born 1868), German

See also

 19th century in poetry
 20th century in poetry
 19th century in literature
 20th century in poetry
 List of years in poetry
 List of years in literature
 Victorian literature
 French literature of the 19th century
 French literature of the 20th century
 Silver Age of Russian Poetry
 Symbolist poetry
 Young Poland (Młoda Polska'') a modernist period in Polish  arts and literature, roughly from 1890 to 1918
 Poetry

Notes

Poetry
19th-century poetry